Hélder Oliveira (born 13 September 1960) is a Portuguese racewalker. He competed in the men's 20 kilometres walk at the 1988 Summer Olympics.

References

1960 births
Living people
Athletes (track and field) at the 1988 Summer Olympics
Portuguese male racewalkers
Olympic athletes of Portugal
Place of birth missing (living people)